Elections to Burnley Borough Council in Lancashire, England were held on 10 June 2004.  One third of the council was up for election and the Labour party lost overall control of the council to no overall control.

After the election, the composition of the council was
Labour 21
Liberal Democrat 11
British National Party 6
Conservative 4
 Others 3

Election result

Ward results

References

BBC News 2004 Burnley Election Results Accessed 2010
Local Council Election Results Archive 2004 Accessed 2010

2004 English local elections
2004
2000s in Lancashire